Drexel University College of Medicine is the medical school of Drexel University, a private research university in Philadelphia, Pennsylvania. The medical school represents the consolidation of two medical schools: Hahnemann Medical College, originally founded as the nation's first college of homeopathy, and the Woman's Medical College of Pennsylvania, the first U.S. medical school for women, which became the Medical College of Pennsylvania when it admitted men in 1970; these institutions merged together in 1993, became affiliated with Drexel in 1998, and were fully absorbed into the university in 2002. With one of the nation's largest enrollments for a private medical school, Drexel University College of Medicine is the second most applied-to medical school in the United States. It is ranked no. 83 in research by U.S. News & World Report.

The college is housed  in East Falls, Philadelphia, Pennsylvania, at the Queen Lane Campus, near the Henry Ave site of the former Woman's Medical College of Pennsylvania. The Queen Lane Campus is primarily used by students during their preclinical training. The Center City Hahnemann University Hospital Campus was the college's primary teaching hospital until its closure in 2019.

The College of Medicine follows a systems-based curriculum that is graded pass/fail. Beginning with the 2017-2018 school year, the MD program transitioned into a curriculum known as "Foundations and Frontiers". Designed to train physicians that are adept at navigating the increasingly multidisciplinary healthcare system of tomorrow, this new curriculum includes essential emerging competencies such as an understanding of population health, health informatics, and health care systems and financing. To foster a greater sense of community, first year medical students are divided into six learning societies based on local iconic landmarks: Athenaeum; Liberty Bell; Physick House; Rocky Statue; Reading Terminal; and Eakins House.

History

Drexel University College of Medicine went through many name changes throughout its history. The medical school began as two separate medical schools: Hahnemann Medical College and Woman's Medical College of Pennsylvania (WMCP). 
In 1848, three homeopathic physicians began operating the Homeopathic Medical College of Pennsylvania, offering M.D. and H.M.D degrees, by teaching 15 students. 
WMCP was founded in 1850 as 'Female Medical College of Pennsylvania' but changed its name in 1867 to WMCP. It was the second medical institution in the world established to train women in medicine to earn the M.D. degree. Upon deciding to admit men in 1970, the college was renamed as the Medical College of Pennsylvania (MCP) In 1993, the Medical College of Philadelphia merged with Hahnemann. Hahnemann had dropped its homeopathic focus by the late 1920s.

In 2002, Drexel University assumed the leadership; this created the College of Medicine in its present form.

Hahnemann Medical College
 Homeopathic Medical College of Pennsylvania, 1848–1869
 Hahnemann Medical College, 1867–1982
 Hahnemann University, 1982–1993

In 1848, three homeopathic physicians — Constantine Hering, Jacob Jeanes and Walter Williamson — opened their practice at a Philadelphia pharmacy on 229 Arch Street with the intent to practice homeopathy. With 15 students they began operating the Homeopathic Medical College of Pennsylvania, offering M.D. and H.M.D degrees. Eventually, the College became affiliated with a hospital and moved to its present location near Broad and Vine Streets. By 1928, the 20-story Broad Street location became the site of one of the first high-rise teaching hospitals in the world.

Woman's Medical College of Pennsylvania

 Female Medical College of Pennsylvania, 1850–1867
 Woman's Medical College of Pennsylvania (WMCP), 1867–1970
 Medical College of Pennsylvania (MCP), 1970–1993

When Hahnemann Medical College left its original site, the building on 229 Arch Street became the first home of the Female (later - after 1867, Woman's) Medical College of Pennsylvania. The New England Female College founded in 1848 but not recognized by the Massachusetts Legislature until April 30, 1850, is considered by some to be the first American medical school for women as it offered a course of medical study to women. On March 11, 1850, however, several weeks before the recognition of the New England Female College, the Pennsylvania legislature passed an act to incorporate the Female Medical College of Pennsylvania. Founded by Quaker businessmen, clergy, and physicians in Philadelphia, "Woman's Med" or MCP was thus the first medical school incorporated in the United States founded specifically to provide medical education exclusively for women. It opened its doors to the first class of women students on October 12, 1850. By 1910, the Woman's Medical College of Pennsylvania "remained as the only school in the United States dedicated to the education of women physicians". When it eventually became coeducational in the later part of the 20th century, it was thus the longest lasting medical school dedicated exclusively to the education of women physicians.

In its early days, female physician training faced serious opposition from the male medical establishment both locally and from notable institutions such as the student body of Harvard Medical School. Students at the Female Medical College of Pennsylvania were jeered. Prevailing notions held women too feeble-minded to succeed in the demanding arena of academic medicine and too delicate to endure the physical requirements of clinical practice. As a result, Ann Preston, M.D., a member of the College's first graduating class, founded the Woman's Hospital of Philadelphia in 1861. In 1866, she became Dean of the Female Medical College of Pennsylvania, the first woman to hold position of dean at an American medical school.

MCP Hahnemann University
 MCP Hahnemann School of Medicine, 1993–1996
 Allegheny University of the Health Sciences, 1996–1998
 MCP Hahnemann University School of Medicine, 1998–2002

The Medical College of Pennsylvania merged with Hahnemann University in 1993, creating four fully accredited schools: the School of Medicine, Graduate School, School of Allied Health Professions, and the School of Continuing Education. In 1993, the College became the first medical school in the country to completely integrate women's health issues into its curriculum instead of an occasional lecture or optional elective. Also in that year MCP and Hahnemann University became part of Allegheny Health Education and Research Foundation (AHERF) and were integrated into the Allegheny University of the Health Sciences (AUHS), which included facilities in Pittsburgh, Pennsylvania. Unfortunately, five years later AHERF, which owned eight Philadelphia hospitals, collapsed in the nation's largest bankruptcy of a non-profit health care organization.

In October 1998, in an historic reorganization, the AHERF hospitals were sold to Tenet Healthcare Corporation, a for-profit hospital corporation based in Texas. A new non-profit corporation, Philadelphia Health & Education Corporation (PHEC), was created to carry on the education, research, and service missions under the name MCP Hahnemann University. Drexel University was hired as the university's operator, to bring the same level of expertise to running this academic medical center that Tenet brought to hospital management operations.

On August 3, 2000, former President Gerald Ford was admitted to the Hospital after suffering two minor strokes while attending the 2000 Republican National Convention, but made a quick recovery afterwards.

Drexel University College of Medicine
 Drexel University College of Medicine, 2002–present
After operating MCP Hahnemann University for three and one-half years, the Drexel Board of Trustees agreed to make its relationship with MCP Hahnemann permanent. On July 1, 2002, two of the MCP Hahnemann schools—the College of Nursing and Health Professions and the School of Public Health—formally became integrated with Drexel, and PHEC continued to operate as a legal affiliate of Drexel under its new name, Drexel University College of Medicine. Shortly thereafter, the Secretary of Education for the Commonwealth of Pennsylvania approved the transfer to Drexel University of all degree-granting authority that had previously been vested in MCP Hahnemann University. As a result, all students of the former MCP Hahnemann University became Drexel students and all alumni became affiliated with Drexel as well.

Today, Drexel University College of Medicine has over 1,000 medical students, more than 500 biomedical graduate students, 550 residents, 600 clinical and basic science faculty, and over 1,700 affiliate and volunteer faculty. The college offers a Woman's Health Education Program for its medical students.

Drexel University College of Medicine offers two curricular tracks for the first two years of preclinical medical education:

 A traditional lecture-based curriculum called the Interdisciplinary Foundations of Medicine (IFM)
 A case-based, problem-based curriculum called the Program for Integrated Learning (PIL)

Approximately 3/4th of each class elects to pursue the IFM curriculum while the remaining 1/4th, after applying to the program and attending the appropriate orientation, will be accepted into the PIL curriculum.

Beginning in the fall of 2017, a new integrated curriculum track, Foundations and Frontiers, replaced the existing dual curricula.

Location

Queen Lane Campus
The College of Medicine's main campus is at the Queen Lane campus of the former Women's Medical College of Pennsylvania. This campus houses first and second-year medical students as well as biomedical graduate students and is located in a suburban-like setting in the East Falls neighborhood of Philadelphia. In 2006 the University finished construction of the  Student Activities Center. This new wing included an expanded gym, recreation room, book store, and an expanded lecture hall that can accommodate the entire class of approximately 260 in one auditorium.

In 2008, the University broke ground on an addition to the building: The Independence Blue Cross Medical Simulation Center. The simulation center, funded in part through a $2.5 million donation from Independence Blue Cross, features lifelike robots and screen-based simulation programs. The computer-driven robotic mannequins, called high-fidelity patient simulators, exhibit lifelike vital signs, including heartbeats, blood pressures, and body and eye movements. They can be programmed to display a variety of normal and abnormal conditions and to respond realistically to student interventions such as intubation, drug injection, or cardiac defibrillation. They can be programmed to speak or cry out in pain.

The center will include a suite of exam rooms equipped with digital audio and visual recording capabilities for use in "standardized patient" encounters. In the 1980s, the College—then Medical College of Pennsylvania—became the first medical school in Philadelphia to employ standardized patients, actors who are taught to portray various clinical conditions and trained to provide feedback to students and residents.

The new addition will also house the Drexel University College of Medicine Institute for Women's Health and Leadership and the Office of Executive Leadership in Academics, which includes the Executive Leadership in Academic Medicine program. The ELAM program is the nation's only in-depth program focused on preparing senior women faculty at schools of medicine, dentistry and public health to move into positions of institutional leadership.

The wing will also serve as the home of the College's Archives and Special Collections, the records Drexel University College of Medicine and its predecessor institutions, including Woman's Medical College of Pennsylvania and Hahnemann Medical College. The collections include books and other publications, photographs, clothing, uniforms, medical instruments and teaching tools. In total, the new addition will encompass  of space over three floors. The anticipated completion date is August 2009.

Center City Hahnemann Campus
The Center City Hahnemann Campus, located in downtown Philadelphia, is the main site for the College's clinical education departments in addition to biomedical facilities and other health-science and public health programs. Hahnemann University Hospital anchors the Center City Hahnemann Campus, along with the Outpatient Clinics, Lecture Halls, and Residence Hall. Drexel's Office of Continuing Medical Education offers the only Physician Refresher/Re-Entry Course on the East Coast for physicians intending to re-enter the workforce after years of inactive practice. The program allows physicians to refresh their knowledge or gain additional training in order to re-enter the workforce.

In 1991, the college purchased the former Elk's Lodge BPOE No. 2 Philadelphia Athletic Club building at 306–320 N. Broad Street for $2.35 million. They demolished it the following year to redevelop the site as a parking garage and computer center.  The building had been added to the National Register of Historic Places in 1984.

In September 2019, the hospital closed.

West Reading Campus
Located in Berks County, Pennsylvania, Drexel University College of Medicine at Tower Health is affiliated with Reading Hospital, which is a Magnet Recognized acute care facility. In 2021, Reading Hospital became a 4-year regional campus of the College of Medicine and began training first-year medical students.

Clinical sites
First-year students have the opportunity to be assigned to a faculty member for the entire year in a clinical setting. The university offers a wide array of clinical sites to its third- and fourth-year students. Operating large urban hospitals and small rural private practices, the university provides numerous opportunities for the students to be exposed to many diverse experiences. During third-year rotations, the students have the option to stay at a particular hospital for the entire year, or rotate among all the various locations throughout the Pennsylvania-New Jersey-Delaware area. Here is a partial list of the various sites:

All-year sites
 Allegheny General Hospital, Pittsburgh, Pennsylvania
 Abington Memorial Hospital, Abington, Pennsylvania
 Wellspan Health, York Hospital, York, Pennsylvania
 Monmouth Medical Center, Long Branch, New Jersey
 Kaiser Permanente, Sacramento, California
 Crozer-Keystone Health System, Upland, Pennsylvania
 Reading Hospital, Reading, Pennsylvania

Partial-year sites
 Bayhealth Medical Center, Dover, Delaware
 Capital Health System, Trenton, New Jersey
 Coatesville VA Medical Center, Coatesville, Pennsylvania
 Crozer-Chester Medical Center, Chester, Pennsylvania
 Easton Hospital, Easton, Pennsylvania
 Friends Hospital, Philadelphia, Pennsylvania 
 Lancaster General Hospital, Lancaster, Pennsylvania
 Lehigh Valley Hospital–Cedar Crest, Allentown, Pennsylvania
 Mercy Hospital, Philadelphia, Pennsylvania
 Pinnacle Hospital, Harrisburg, Pennsylvania
 St. Christopher's Hospital for Children, Philadelphia, Pennsylvania
 Saint Peter's University Hospital, New Brunswick, New Jersey

Notable alumni

The Drexel University College of Medicine and its predecessor medical schools have graduated physicians such as Susan La Flesche Picotte, the first Native American female physician; Anandi Gopal Joshi, the first Indian female physician in the United States; Rebecca Cole, the second African-American female physician in the United States; Patricia Robertson, a NASA astronaut and physician; and Sandra Lee, a dermatologist who became an Internet celebrity and star of the TLC TV series Dr. Pimple Popper, and Jameela Al Salman who was awarded by the Prime Minister in the Kingdom of Bahrain for the best governmental practices in the program of antibiotic stewardship.

See also
 Medical campus of Philadelphia
 Medical schools in Pennsylvania
 Pi Upsilon Rho

References

External links
 

Drexel University
1848 establishments in Pennsylvania
Embedded educational institutions
Former women's universities and colleges in the United States
Medical schools in Pennsylvania
Universities and colleges in Philadelphia